The abbreviation kyr means "thousand years".

kyr was formerly common in some English language works, especially in geology and astronomy, for the unit of 1,000 years or millennium. The "k" is the unit prefix for kilo- or thousand with the suffix "yr" simply an abbreviation for "year".

Occasionally, the "k" is shown in upper case, as in "100 Kyr"; this is an incorrect usage.  "kyr" itself is often considered incorrect, with some preferring to use "ky".

ISO 80000-3 recommends usage of ka (for kiloannum), which avoids the implicit English bias of "year" by using a Latin root.

See also
 Annum
 Myr
 Byr

External links
How Many? A Dictionary of Units of Measurement, A
How Many? A Dictionary of Units of Measurement, K
How Many? A Dictionary of Units of Measurement, Y

Units of time
Geology
Units of measurement in astronomy